The ARCA Menards Series West has held several races at Irwindale Speedway in Irwindale, California over the years. The track currently has two races for the series, which are in March and July and share the same name, the NAPA Auto Parts 150 presented by the West Coast Stock Car Hall of Fame. Races at the track have varied from 50 miles to 150 miles.

Past winners

ARCA Menards Series West 

 2000 (November race), 2001 (May race), 2004 (both races), 2021 (August race), 2022 (both races): Race extended due to a Green–white–checker finish.

References

External links
 

Motorsport in California
Recurring sporting events established in 1999
ARCA Menards Series West
NASCAR races at Irwindale Event Center